The Miaoli County Urban Planning Exhibition Center is a gallery of in Miaoli City, Miaoli County, Taiwan about the history of Miaoli County.

History
The building of the center used to be the building for Miaoli County Government before it moved to the building next to the center. The center was constructed with a cost of NT$164 million.

Architecture
The center is housed in a 2-story building.

Exhibitions
The center exhibits the current information and history about Miaoli County which are displayed through imaging technology and scale models.

Transportation
The center is accessible within walking distance south of Miaoli Station of Taiwan Railways.

See also
 List of museums in Taiwan

References

External links
 

Buildings and structures in Miaoli County
Miaoli City